The Vijayabā Kollaya (Sack of Vijayabahu) took place in the Kingdom of Kotte in 1521. The three sons of the reigning king Vijayabahu VI mutinied against their father, killing him, and divided the Kingdom among themselves. The three sons were products of the king's first marriage and were named Bhuvanekabahu (later Bhuvanekabãhu VII of Kotte), Pararajasingha (later Raigam Bandara) and Mayadunne (later Mayadunne of Sitawaka). Queen Kiravella, whom the king married second, had a son named Deva Rajasinghe by her previous marriage. The princes overheard that the king intended to make Devaraja the heir to the throne, at the request of his second queen, and became hostile to the king, and hired a foreigner to murder the king in the palace.

Background

Before his elevation to the throne, prince Vijayabahu used to reside with his brother Chakrayudabahu , and his wife Kirawelle Mahabiso Bandara, as an associate husband. During their stay at Menikkadawara, the princess gave birth to four princes, Maha Rayigam Bandara who died at a young age, Bhuvanekabahu, Para Rajasinghe, and Mayadunne Raja. Soon Chakrayudabahu and his wife died, leaving the three princes with Vijayabahu.

Once Vijayabahu was raised to the throne as King Vijayabahu VII, he married another princess of Kirawelle. She brought with her a boy named Deva Rajasinghe whom Vijayabahu adopted. Later King Vijayabahu VII plotted with two of his courtiers, Kandure Bandara and Ekanayake Mudali, in order to make Deva Rajasinghe his heir. The three princes discover the plot and with the assistance of the priests, fled from the capital (Sri Jayawardenapura Kotte) and remained hidden in Borales Migomuwa (Boralesgamuwa in Salpiti Korale). Whilst the two elder princes remained under the care of the Patabenda of Yapa Patuna, prince Mayadunne made his way to the Kingdom of Kandy ruled by King Jayavira whose queen was Mayadunne’s cousin. With her help, Mayadunne managed to secure the assistance of King Jayavira who provided Mayadunne the army of Four Korale.

Marching down, Mayadunne ravaged Pitigal Korale and camped closed to Kelaniya in the vicinity of Sri Jarawardenapura Kotte. He was joined by his two brothers and together made preparations for war. Meanwhile part of King Vijayabahu VII’s army was in favor of the princes and declared “we will not fight against the royal princes”. As a result, the King was forced to sue for peace and the princes insisted that, the two ministers who were involved with the plot were to be handed over for punishment. Kandure Bandara was flogged to death by their orders but Ekanayake Mudali managed to seek sanctuary with the priests.

Spoiling of Vijayabahu
The three princes entered the capital with their army. Unknown to them, King Vijayabahu had a detachment of sixty chosen soldiers lying in concealment at Rahas Kunda Watta  in order to bar the palace gates and to assassinate the princes. The unsuspecting princes entered the palace leaving their army outside. On their way, they met young prince Deva Rajasinghe who was seven years old. When Mayadunne inquired about the current events of the city, he innocently told about the soldiers who were waiting to fall up on them. The three princes dashed out, through the Karandupathi gate and escaped to their army. The army was informed about the King’s treachery and decided to kill the King. A game of Nirogi  was organized and the crowds gathered to see it were persuaded to join their cause. Meanwhile the princes managed to win over the king’s army and both armies broke into the palace, with the angry mob.

They plundered the palace, treasury, and the harem. They burst open the treasure chests and gems, gold, silver, silk, and pearls were looted. Vijayabahu's valuables and royal wardrobe were tossed from hand to hand. However, strict orders were conveyed by beating drums, that none of the citizens were to be harmed so as to prevent looting in the streets. Meanwhile Vijayabahu was allowed to escape to the upper storey. He locked himself in a room with two of his concubines.

During the night it was decided to assassinate the King. However since none of the Sinhalese dared to shed royal blood , a foreign assassin called Salman was hired to finish the deed; he killed Vijayabahu inside his chamber.

Rebellion of Hapitigama
The following morning, the council of ministers assembled and selected prince Bhuvanekabahu, the eldest prince, to succeed to the throne. . The succession was challenged by the King Vijayabahu’s sisters’ son, Pilesse Widiye Bandara (also known as Vira Surya). With the assistance of Mannamperiya the Aswela Arachchila (the late king’s equerry) he left Sri Jayawardenapura Kotte with a considerable number of followers. Through Aluthkuruwa they arrived at Ambana and Pasonnuwara and raised the standard of rebellion in Hapitigama Korale. Prince Mayadunne arrived with an army and subdued the rebellion by killing both the ringleaders. Inhabitants of the Hapitigama Korale were severely punished and several high caste nobles were given over to Pannayo, one of the lowest castes, whose duty was to cut grass for the elephants.

Kingdom Divided
After pacifying the rebellion, a formal coronation took place and Bhuvanekabahu came to the throne as King Buvanekabahu VII. As advised by the chief minister Illangakon, the kingdom was divided into three parts. Youngest prince, Mayadunne, received Seethawaka, Denawaka and Four Korales as Kingdom of Sitawaka while Prince Rayigam Bandara received Raigama, Walallawiti and Pasyodun Korale (excluding the sea ports) as the Principality of Raigama. These were granted as fiefs by Royal sannas and they were given the titles as Kings while Bhuvanekabahu ruled the rest of the territory as emperor.

See also
 Mayadunne
 Kingdom of Kotte
 Kingdom of Sitawaka

Notes

References

Bibliography
 B. Gunasekara, The Rajavaliya. AES reprint. New Delhi: Asian Educational Services, 1995. 
 Paul E. Peiris, Ceylon the Portuguese Era: being a history of the island for the period, 1505–1658, Volume 1. Tisara Publishers Ltd.: Sri Lanka, 1992.
 S.G. Perera, A history of Ceylon for schools – The Portuguese and Dutch period. The Associated Newspapers of Ceylon Ltd.: Sri Lanka, 1942.

Crisis of the Sixteenth Century